Cerro Blanco ("White Hill") is a caldera in the Andes of the Catamarca Province in Argentina. The caldera is associated with a less well-defined caldera to the south and several lava domes.

The caldera has been active for the last eight million years, and eruptions have created several ignimbrites. An eruption occurred 73,000 years ago and formed the Campo de la Piedra Pómez ignimbrite layer. About 2,300 ± 160 BCE, the largest known volcanic eruption of the Central Andes, with a VEI-7, occurred at Cerro Blanco, forming the most recent caldera as well as thick ignimbrite layers. About  of tephra were erupted then. The volcano has been dormant since then with some deformation and geothermal activity. A major future eruption would put nearby communities to the south at risk.

The volcano is also known for giant ripple marks that have formed on its ignimbrite fields. Persistent wind action on the ground has shifted gravel and sand, forming wave-like structures. These ripple marks are among the largest on Earth and have been compared to Martian ripple marks by geologists.

Geography and geomorphology 

The volcano lies at the southern margin of the Argentine Puna, on the border between the Antofagasta de la Sierra Department and the Tinogasta Department in the Catamarca Province of Argentina. Trails run through the area, and there are abandoned mining operations. Provincial Route 34 (Catamarca) between Fiambalá and Antofagasta de la Sierra runs past Cerro Blanco. The volcano is sometimes known as Cerro Blanco, meaning "white hill" in Spanish, and sometimes as Robledo; the Smithsonian Institution uses the latter name.

Calderas and lava domes 

Only their northern margins are recognisable in satellite images; their southern parts are filled with block-and-ash flows from the southern calderas. The southern calderas are the Robledo and Cerro Blanco calderas, which form a southeast-northwest trending pair. Alternative interpretations consider the Pie de San Buenaventura, Robledo and Cerro Blanco calderas as one  caldera, that the Robledo and Cerro Blanco calderas are one system or envisage the existence of only three calderas.

They are formed by ignimbrite breccia, ignimbrites and lava domes cut by the caldera margins. The caldera floor is almost entirely covered by block-and-ash flows, apart from an area where hydrothermal activity has left white sinter deposits. A slight circular uplift on the caldera floor may be a cryptodome.

Three additional lava domes surround this dome, and an explosion crater lies to its southwest. West of this crater there are three pinkish lava domes lined up in west-southwest direction away from the main dome; these are surrounded by pyroclastic cones and depressions.

Owing to erosion, the Robledo caldera is less well defined than the Cerro Blanco caldera. A site southeast of the Robledo caldera is known as Robledo. South of the Robledo caldera lies the Portezuelo de Robledo mountain pass, the south-eastward trending El Médano plain and the Robledo valley.

It does not have a strong topographic expression but is conspicuous on satellite images as a semi-circular patch of darker material. Gravimetric analysis has found a number of gravity anomalies around the caldera.

Surrounding terrain 

The terrain northeast-east from Cerro Blanco is covered by its ignimbrites and by Plinian fallout deposits which radiate away from the calderas. Cerro Blanco lies at the southwestern end of the Carachipampa valley, a volcano-tectonic depression flanked by normal faults which extends to Carachipampa. This depression appears to have formed in response to north-south tectonic extension of the Puna and is covered by volcanic deposits from Cerro Blanco. To the north, the El Niño scarp of the El Niño caldera separates the Cerro Blanco caldera from the Purulla valley.

Other valleys are the Purulla valley northwest from Cerro Blanco and Incahuasi due north; all three contain both volcanic deposits from Cerro Blanco and salt flats or lakes.

Aeolian landscapes 

One of the most spectacular aeolian landscapes is found at Cerro Blanco, where large wind-formed ripple marks occur. Wind-driven erosion of ignimbrites has generated the ripples, which consist of gravel, pebbles and sand and are covered with gravel. Smaller gravelly ripples lie atop the larger ripples and troughs and there are intermediate sized forms ( high); they may be precursors to the large ripples and make up most of the ripples in the fields. Their wind-driven movement is fast enough that trails abandoned four years before are already partly covered with them.

Various wind-dependent mechanisms have been proposed to explain their large size, including the presence of roll vortexes, Helmholtz instability-like phenomena, atmospheric gravity waves or creep-like movement when pumice fragments and sand are lifted from the ground by wind and fall back. The latter view envisages that undulating terrain triggers the development of ripples through the accumulation of gravel and sand at such undulations. Their formation appears to be influenced by whether the rock material available can be moved by wind while a role of the bedrock structure or the size of the material is controversial.

Wind has also formed demoiselles and yardangs in the ignimbrites. These are particularly well expressed in the Campo de Piedra Pomez area southeast of the Carachipampa valley, a  area where yardangs, hoodoos and wind-exposed cliffs create a majestic landscape. They have fluted surfaces. The yardangs appear to form beginning from either a pre-existing topographic elevation or a fumarolic vent where the rock has been hardened, and eventually develop through a series of early, intermediate and late yardang forms as wind and wind-transported particles erode the rocks. Their layout may be influenced by regional tectonics, pre-existent topography and the patterns formed by the ignimbrite deposits. Exposed rocks are often covered with brown, orange or beige desert varnish and sometimes are oversteepened and collapse.

Bedrock ridges are cut into ignimbrites of the Incahuasi valley. This terrain gradually leads over into the megaripple-covered surface through an increased gravel cover. The development of these megaripples appears to have been influenced by the underlying bedrock ridges which move along with the overlying ripples. These bedrock ridges are formed through erosion by wind and by wind-transported particles, it is not clear how they are then exposed from the ripples. Additional aeolian landforms in the region are known and include ventifacts and so-called "aeolian rat tails"; these are small structures which form when erosion-resistant rock fragments slow wind erosion in their lee, thus leaving a tail-like area where less rock is eroded. Wind streaks occur in groups.

It was among the finalists in the "Seven Wonders of Argentina" contest but was not selected when the results were announced in 2019.

Regional 

The Cordillera de San Buenaventura marks the southern margin of the Puna and extends west-southwestwards from Cerro Blanco to the volcanoes San Francisco and Falso Azufre and the Paso de San Francisco. It marks the boundary between the steep subduction to the north from the shallower subduction to the south.

A series of andesitic to dacitic stratovolcanoes ranging in age from 1 to 6 million years old make up the Cordillera de San Buenaventura, and Quaternary basaltic volcanoes are dispersed over the wider region.

Geology 

It is responsible for the volcanism in the Andes, which is localised in three volcanic zones known as the Northern Volcanic Zone, Central Volcanic Zone and Southern Volcanic Zone. Cerro Blanco is part of the Andean Central Volcanic Zone (CVZ), and one of its southernmost volcanoes. The CVZ is sparsely inhabited and recent volcanic activity is only poorly recorded; Lascar is the only regularly active volcano there.

The CVZ extends over the Altiplano-Puna where calc-alkaline volcanism has been ongoing since the Miocene. Characteristic for the CVZ are the large fields of ignimbritic volcanism and associated calderas, chiefly in the Altiplano-Puna volcanic complex. In the southern part of the CVZ such volcanic systems are usually small and are poorly studied. During the Neogene, volcanism commenced in the Maricunga belt and eventually shifted to its present-day location in the Western Cordillera. Tectonic processes also took place, such as two phases of east-west compression; the first was in the middle Miocene and the second began 7 million years ago.

Volcanism in the southern Puna region initiated about 8 million years ago and took place in several stages, which were characterised by the emplacement of lava domes and of ignimbrites such as the 4.0–3.7 million year old Laguna Amarga-Laguna Verde ignimbrites. Some of the domes are located close to the border with Chile in the Ojos del Salado and Nevado Tres Cruces area. Later there also were mafic eruptions, which generated lava flows in the Carachipampa and Laguna de Purulla area. The late mafic eruption products and the Cerro Blanco volcanics are geologically classified as making up the "Purulla Supersynthem". From the Miocene to the Pliocene the La Hoyada volcanic complex was active southwest of Cerro Blanco in the form of several stratovolcanoes that produced the Cordillera de San Buenaventura; afterwards came a two-million year long hiatus. Cerro Blanco overlies this volcanic complex and outcrops of La Hoyada are found inside and around the calderas; sometimes it is considered part of La Hoyada.

The basement is formed by metamorphic, sedimentary and volcanic rocks of Neoproterozoic to Paleogene age. The former are particularly represented east of Cerro Blanco and go back in part to the Precambrian, the latter occur mainly west and consist of Ordovician volcano-sedimentary units. Both are intruded by granitoids and mafic and ultramafic rocks. Permian sediments and Paleogene rocks complete the nonvolcanic geology. Local tectonic structures such as borders between crustal domains and northeast-southwest trending faults might control the position of volcanic vents. Tectonic processes may also be responsible for the elliptic shape of the Cerro Blanco caldera. There is evidence of intense earthquakes during the Quaternary and some faults such as the El Peñón Fault have been recently active.

Composition 

Most of the volcanic rocks found at Cerro Blanco are rhyolites and define two suites of calc-alkaline rocks. Minerals encountered in the volcanic rocks include biotite, feldspar, ilmenite, magnetite quartz, less commonly amphibole, clinopyroxene, orthopyroxene, and rarely apatite, allanite-epidote, muscovite, titanite and zircon. Fumarolic alteration on the caldera ground has produced alunite, boehmite and kaolinite and deposited opal, quartz and silica.

The rhyolites erupted at Cerro Blanco appear to form from andesite magmas, through processes such as fractional crystallisation and the absorption of crustal materials.

Climate and vegetation 

Mean temperatures in the region are below  but daily temperature fluctuations can reach  and insolation is intense. Vegetation in the region is classified as a high desert vegetation. It is bushy and relatively sparse, with thicker plant growth found at hot springs and in the craters where humid soils occur, perhaps wetted by ascending vapour.

This aridity is a consequence of the region being within the Andean Arid Diagonal, which separates the northern monsoon precipitation regime from the southern westerlies precipitation regime, and the rain shadow of the Andes, which prevents eastern moisture from reaching the area. The climate of the region has been arid since the Miocene but fluctuations in humidity occurred especially during the last glacial and between 9,000–5,000 years ago when climate was wetter. The aridity results in a good preservation of volcanic products.

Strong winds blow at Cerro Blanco. Average windspeeds are unknown owing to the lack of measurements in the thinly populated region and there are contrasting reports on wind speed extremes but gusts of  have been recorded in July and wind speeds in early December 2010 regularly exceeded . Winds blow mainly from the northwest, and have been stable in that orientation for the past 2 million years. This favoured the development of extensive aeolian landforms although winds coming from other directions also play a role. Thermal winds are generated by differential heating of surfaces in the region, and diurnal winds are controlled by the day-night cycle. Winds kick up pyroclastic material, generating dust storms which remove dust and sand from the area. Some of the dust is carried out into the Pampa, where it forms loess deposits, and dust deposition at Cerro Blanco can quickly obscure vehicle tracks. Dust devils have been observed.

Eruption history 

The Cerro Blanco volcanic system has been active during the Pleistocene and Holocene. The oldest volcanic rock formation related to Cerro Blanco is the over 750,000 years old so-called "Cortaderas Synthem". Its outcrops are limited to the Laguna Carachipampa area. It consists of two ignimbrites, the Barranca Blanca Ignimbrite and the Carachi Ignimbrite, which erupted a long time apart. The former is a massive, white, unwelded ignimbrite, the latter is massive, rose-coloured and weakly welded. They contain pumice and fragments of extraneous rock and consist of rhyodacite unlike later units. These ignimbrites, whose chronological relation to each other is unknown, were probably produced by "boil-over" of a volcanic vent rather than by an eruption column. Their exact source vent is unknown.

It was emplaced in two units a short time from each other. They both contain pumice and fragments of country rock, similar to the Cortaderas Synthem. The most reliable radiometrically obtained dates for this ignimbrite indicate an age of 73,000 years; previous estimates of their age were 560,000 ± 110,000 and 440,000 ± 10,000 years before present. The 73,000 age is considered to be more reliable but in 2022 an age of 54,600 ± 600 years was proposed for this eruption. The eruption reached level 6 on the Volcanic Explosivity Index and is also known as the first cycle ignimbrite. The eruption has been described as the largest caldera collapse at Cerro Blanco but the source vent for this eruption has not been found, and there is no agreement whether the Robledo Caldera is the source. The volcano-tectonic depression northeast of Cerro Blanco or the Pie de San Buenaventura and El Niño scarps have been proposed as a source. As with the Cortaderas Synthem, this ignimbrite was produced by a boiling-over vent and the pyroclastic flows lacked the intensity to override local topography. It is possible that the eruption proceeded in two phases, with a magmatic reinvigoration of the system between the two. After the ignimbrite cooled and solidified, cracks formed in the rocks and were later eroded by wind. The Campo de la Piedra Pómez Ignimbrite crops out mainly on the southeastern and northwestern sides of the Carachipampa valley, as between these two outcrops it was buried by the later Cerro Blanco ignimbrite; other outcrops lie in the Incahuasi and Purulla valleys. The Robledo and Pie de San Buenaventura calderas were formed during the early activity.

A 22,700–20,900 years old tephra deposit in a lake of northwestern Argentina has been attributed to Cerro Blanco. The volcano appears to have erupted repeatedly during the Holocene. Explosive eruptions took place between 8,830 ± 60 and 5,480 ± 40 years before present and deposited tephra and ignimbrites south of Cerro Blanco. Two tephra deposits in the Calchaquí valley have been attributed to Cerro Blanco; one of these is probably linked to the 4.2 ka eruption.

4.2 ka eruption 

A large eruption occurred approximately 4,200 years ago. Block-and-ash flow deposits (classified as "CB") found around the caldera have been interpreted as indicating that a lava dome was erupted prior to the caldera collapse at Cerro Blanco, although it is not clear by how much this eruption predates the main eruption. Deposits from this lava dome-forming episode consist of blocks which sometimes exceed sizes of  embedded within ash and lapilli.

A vent opened up, presumably on the southwestern side of the future caldera, and generated a 27 km (17 mi)-high eruption column. Fissure vents may have opened as well. After an initial, unstable phase during which alternating layers of lapilli and volcanic ash (unit "CB1") fell out and covered the previous topography, a more steady column deposited thicker rhyolitic tephra layers (unit "CB2"). At this time, a change in rock composition occurred, perhaps due to new magma entering the magma chamber.

The tephra deposits in the Valles Calchaquies and Tafi del Valle area are known as mid-Holocene ash, Ash C, Buey Muerto ash, and V1 ash layer, and it has been found northeast of Antofagasta de la Sierra. The tephra from the 4.2 ka eruption has been used as a chronological marker in the region. Modelling suggests the tephra might have reached Brazil and Paraguay farther east. Close to the vent, tephra fallout was emplaced on the Cordillera de San Buenaventura. Some of the tephra deposits close to the caldera have been buried by sediments, or soil development has set in. Wind removed the volcanic ash, leaving block and lapilli sized pebbles that cover most of the deposits; in some places dunes have formed from pebbles.

Pyroclastic flows also formed, perhaps through instability of the eruption column (unit "CB3"), and spread away from the volcano through surrounding valleys. They consist of pumice fragments of varying sizes embedded within ash, as well as country rock that was torn up and embedded in the flows. North-westward and north-eastward flowing ignimbrites generated ignimbrite fans in the Purulla and Carachipampa valleys, respectively.

The deposits from this event are also known as Cerro Blanco Ignimbrite, as Ignimbrite of the second cycle or El Médano or Purulla Ignimbrite. Formerly these were dated to be 12,000 and 22,000 years old, respectively, and related to the Cerro Blanco and (potentially) Robledo calderas. Cerro Blanco is considered to be the youngest caldera of the Central Andes.

It is the largest known Holocene eruption in the Central Andes and of the Central Volcanic Zone, larger than the 1600 Huaynaputina eruption, the largest historical eruption of the Central Volcanic Zone. Most of the erupted volume was ejected by the eruption column, while only about  ended up in pyroclastic flows. Caldera collapse occurred during the course of the eruption, generating the unusually small (for the size of the eruption) Cerro Blanco caldera through a probably irregular collapse.

Some authors have postulated that mid-Holocene eruptions of Cerro Blanco impacted human communities in the region. Tephra deposits in the Formative Period archaeological site of Palo Blanco in the Bolsón de Fimabalá have been attributed to Cerro Blanco, as is a tephra layer in an archaeological site close to Antofagasta de la Sierra. At Cueva Abra del Toro in northeastern Catamarca Province, rodents disappeared after the eruption and there was a change in human activity. The eruptions of Cerro Blanco may – together with more local seismic activity – be responsible for the low population density of the Fiambalá region, Chaschuil valley and western Tinogasta Department during the Archaic period between 10,000 and 3,000 years ago. The 4.2 kiloyear climatic event occurred at the same time; it may be in some way related to the Cerro Blanco eruption.

Post–4.2 ka activity 

After the caldera-forming eruption, renewed effusive eruptions generated the lava domes southwest of and on the margin of the Cerro Blanco caldera and phreatic/phreatomagmatic activity occurred. The current topography of Cerro Blanco is formed by the deposits from this stage, whose activity was influenced by intersecting fault systems including a northeast-southwest trending fault that controls the position of lava domes outside and fumarolic vents within the caldera.

It's not clear how long after the 4.2 ka eruption this activity occurred, but it has been grouped as the "CB" unit (the domes are classified as "CB1"). This activity also generated block-and-ash deposits (unit "CB2") on the caldera floor. The domes are of rhyolitic composition, the block-and-ash deposits consist of ash and lapilli and appear to have formed when domes collapsed. As lava domes grow, they tend to become unstable as their vertical extent increases until they collapse. Additionally, internally generated explosions appear to have occurred at Cerro Blanco as lava domes grew and sometimes completely destroyed the domes.

Present-day status 
No historical eruptions have been observed or recorded at Cerro Blanco, but various indicators imply that it is still active. In 2007–2009, seismic swarms were recorded at less than  depth.

Fumaroles release mainly carbon dioxide and water vapour with smaller amounts of hydrogen, hydrogen sulfide and methane; they reach temperatures of  while temperatures of  have been reported for the hot ground. Active fumaroles and clay cones formed by fumarolic activity are also found in the phreatic crater. The geothermal system appears to consist of an aquifer hosted within pre-volcano rocks and heated by a magma chamber from below, with the Cerro Blanco ignimbrites acting as an effective seal. Supporting the effectiveness of the seal, total emissions of carbon dioxide exceed  but are considerably lower than at other active geothermal systems of the Andes. It has been prospected for possible geothermal power generation.

A second geothermal field related to Cerro Blanco is located south of the volcano and is known as Los Hornitos or Terma Los Hornos, in the area of the Los Hornos and Las Vizcachas creeks. The springs deposit travertine, forming cascades, dams, pools and terraces of varying size, as well as pebbles. Fossil travertine deposits are also found and form a carbonate rock plateau generated by waters rising from a fissure. The Los Hornos system has been interpreted as a leak from the Cerro Blanco geothermal system, and south-westward trending fault systems might connect it to the Cerro Blanco magmatic system.

Deformation and hazards 

Subsidence at a rate of  has been noted at the caldera since 1992 in InSAR images. The subsidence occurs at  depth and has been related to either a cooling magmatic system, changes in the hydrothermal system or to subsidence that followed the 4.2 ka eruption and is still ongoing. Uplift in the area surrounding the caldera has also been identified.

The Argentinian Mining and Geological Service has ranked Cerro Blanco eight in its scale of hazardous volcanoes in Argentina. Rhyolitic caldera systems like Cerro Blanco can produce large eruptions separated by short time intervals. Future activity might involve either a "boiling-over" of pyroclastic flows or Plinian eruptions. Given that the region is sparsely inhabited, the primary effects of a new eruption at Cerro Blanco would come from the eruption column, which could spread tephra eastwards and impact air traffic there.

Research history 

Research in the region commenced in the 19th century and was mainly concentrated on mining. Cerro Blanco received attention from scientists after satellite images in the early 21st century observed deflation of the caldera. A number of Holocene tephra layers have been identified in the region, but linking these to specific eruptions has been difficult until 2008–2010 when some of these were linked to the Cerro Blanco vent. Scientific interest rose in the 2010s due to the discovery of the large 4.2 ka eruption.

See also 

 Cerro Torta

Notes

References

Sources

External links 

 Estilo eruptivo y dinámica de flujo de las corrientes de densidad piroclásticas asociadas a la gran erupción del Cerro Blanco (4200 AP), Puna Austral
 Informe Geológico Correspondiente a la Mina La Hoyada, Departamento Tinogasta, Provincia de Catamarca
 Travel information of the Provincial government of Catamarca (in Spanish)
 

VEI-7 volcanoes
Volcanoes of Catamarca Province
Pleistocene calderas
Holocene calderas
Calderas of Argentina